Ipswich  is a constituency represented in the House of Commons of the UK Parliament since December 2019 by Tom Hunt of the Conservative Party.

History 
The constituency was created as Parliamentary Borough in the fourteenth century, returning two MPs to the House of Commons of England until 1707, then to the House of Commons of Great Britain until 1800, and from 1800 to the House of Commons of the United Kingdom. The constituency's parliamentary representation was reduced to a single seat with one MP under the Representation of the People Act 1918. Prior to the 1983 general election, when north-western areas were transferred to the Central Suffolk constituency, the Parliamentary and Municipal/County Boroughs were the same.

Ipswich was the only seat won by a Labour candidate at the 2017 general election from a total of seven seats in Suffolk, the others being retained by Conservatives and more rural in comparison to Ipswich. Martin's 2017 election victory was one of thirty net gains made by the Labour Party. Ipswich is a marginal seat, having changed hands nine times since its creation as a single-member constituency in 1918.

Before the Reform Act 1832, the franchise in Ipswich was in the hands of the Ipswich Corporation and the Freemen. Ipswich was seen as a partisan seat with active Blue (Tory inclined) and Yellow (Whig inclined) factions dominating elections for both Parliament and the Corporation and comparatively rare split tickets of one Whig and one Tory being returned to Parliament, although the identification of the local parties with national parties could at times be very blurred.  In the mid eighteenth century the constituency had an electorate of around 700, which was a middle sized borough by the standards of the time - and a reputation of a borough that was likely to offer stiff opposition to government favoured candidates.

Constituency profile 
The constituency includes Ipswich town centre and docks, with its mix of historic buildings and modern developments. Ipswich is a bustling town that serves as a centre for the rest of Suffolk which is predominantly rural and remote, and has the only serious concentration of Labour voters in the county, other than in Lowestoft.

Portman Road Football Ground to the West of the centre, and the new university to the East are both in the seat, as is the vast Chantry council estate to the South.

Ipswich's Conservative-leaning suburbs, such as Castle Hill, Westerfield and Kesgrave, extend beyond the constituency's boundaries – the northernmost wards are in the Suffolk Central constituency, and several strong Conservative areas are just outside the borough's tightly drawn limits, making Ipswich a target seat for Labour.

The Ipswich constituency has generally been favourable to candidates from the Labour Party, being won by Labour at every postwar general election since the end of World War II; except 1970, February 1974, 1987, 2010, 2015 and 2019. Despite this, it was traditionally won by the party by fairly small margins; however, from 1997 until being gained by the Conservative Party in 2010, Labour won the contests with safer margins, and after the Conservatives increased their majority in 2015, Labour regained the seat in 2017 only to lose it again in 2019 when the Conservative candidate got more than half the votes cast when there were more than two candidates for the first time since 1919.

Boundaries and boundary changes 

1918–1983: The County Borough of Ipswich.

1983–2010: The Borough of Ipswich wards of Bixley, Bridge, Chantry, Gainsborough, Priory Heath, Rushmere, St Clement's, St John's, St Margaret's, Sprites, Stoke Park, and Town.

The Broomhill, Castle Hill, White House and Whitton wards were transferred to the new county constituency of Central Suffolk (Central Suffolk and North Ipswich from 1997).

2010–present: The Borough of Ipswich wards of Alexandra, Bixley, Bridge, Gainsborough, Gipping, Holywells, Priory Heath, Rushmere, St John's, St Margaret's, Sprites, Stoke Park, and Westgate.

Following a revision of the Borough of Ipswich wards, the constituency gained a small area from Central Suffolk and North Ipswich.

The present-day constituency consists of most of the Borough of Ipswich, with the exception of the Castle Hill, Whitehouse and Whitton wards.

Members of Parliament 

Freemen belonging to the Ipswich Corporation were entitled to elect two burgesses to the Parliament of England from the fourteenth century which continued uninterrupted after the parliament united with Scotland and Ireland.  only becoming a single member constituency in 1918.

MPs 1386–1660

MPs 1660–1832

MPs 1832–1918 

During the period between 1835 and 1842 there were five elections and all were found to have been corrupt. After the 1835 election, Dundas and Kelly were unseated on the charge of bribery. After the 1837 election, Tufnell was unseated on a scrutiny. Gibson, who was elected in 1838, resigned. Cochrane was elected in 1839, after which a petition was presented complaining of gross bribery – it was not progressed because a general election was expected. After the 1841 election, Wason and Rennie were unseated, being declared guilty of bribery by their agents.

MPs 1918–present

Elections

Elections in the 2020s

Elections in the 2010s

Elections in the 2000s

Following the death of Jamie Cann on 15 October 2001, a by-election was held on 22 November 2001.

Elections in the 1990s

Elections in the 1980s

Elections in the 1970s

Elections in the 1960s

Election in the 1950s

Election in the 1940s

Elections in the 1930s

Elections in the 1920s

Elections in the 1910s

Change of vote share and swing calculated from the December 1910 party ticket vote.

General election 1914/15:

Another general election was required to take place before the end of 1915. The political parties had been making preparations for an election to take place and by July 1914, the following candidates had been selected; 
Unionist: John Ganzoni
Liberal: Daniel Ford Goddard
Independent Labour:  Robert Jackson (not supported by Labour Party HQ)

Elections in the 1900s

Elections in the 1890s

Elections in the 1880s

 

 

 

 

 Caused by the 1885 election being declared void on account of bribery.

 

 

 

 Caused by Cobbold's death.

Elections in the 1870s

 

 

 Caused by Cobbold's death.

Elections in the 1860s

Elections in the 1850s

Elections in the 1840s

 
 

 
 
 
 

 
 
 

 

 
 
 

 Caused by the earlier by-election being declared void on petition, due to bribery by Cuffe's and Gladstone's agents, on 30 July 1842.

 
 
 

 

 
 
 

 Caused by the general election result being declared void on petition, due to bribery by Wason's and Ronnie's agents, on 25 April 1842

Elections in the 1830s

 
 
 

 
 

 Caused by Gibson's defection to the Whigs.

 
 
 

 
 
 
 
 

 Tufnell was later unseated on petition, and Kelly was returned in his place

 
 

 
 

 
 
 

 Caused by the 1835 election being declared void on petition

Elections in the 1820s

 
 
 
 
 

 
 
 

 After a successful electoral petition, Dundas and Mackinnon were declared elected.

 
 
 
 
 

 
 
 

 Figures are shown pre and post scrutiny.  After a successful electoral petition, Haldimand and Barrett-Lennard were declared elected.

Elections in the 1810s

 
 
 
 
 

 
 
 

 Figures are shown pre and post scrutiny.

Elections in the 1800s

 
 
 
 
 

 
 
 

 
 
 
 
 

 
 
 

 

 

 Caused by the death of Charles Crickitt

Elections in the 1790s

Elections in the 1780s

 
 
 
 

 
 

 By election called after the election of John Cator was declared void

Elections in the 1770s

Elections in the 1760s

 
 
 
 
 

 
 
 

 
 
 

 Called when Vernon became a Commissioner for Trade and Plantations

Elections in the 1750s

 
 
 

 Called on the death of Samuel Kent

 
 
 

Called on the death of Edward Vernon

 
 
 
 
 

 Unusually the Yellows supported in Edward Vernon an identifiable Tory and critic of the Whig government.  The Blues meanwhile supported Samuel Kent and Richard Lloyd, both supporters of the Whig government.  Although Lloyd would later withdraw before that point it had proved an expensive contest for Vernon.

Elections in the 1740s

Elections in the 1730s

 
 
 
 
 

 
 
 

 
 
 

 Called on death of Francis Negus

 
 
 

 Called on William Thompson becoming a judge

Elections in the 1720s

 
 
 
 

 
 
 

 
 
 

 By-election called on William Thompson being made a Baron of the Exchequer

Elections in the 1710s

 
 
 

 By-election called on William Churchill winning a government contract for stationary and resigning his seat as an office of profit to the crown.  Instead of seeking re-election he stood in favour of his son in law Francis Negus. 

 
 
 

 By-election called on William Thompson becoming Solicitor General

 
 
 
 
 

 
 
 
 
 
 
 

 Successfully overturned through an electoral petition and Richardson and Bridgeman installed as MPs.

Elections in the 1700s

 
 
 
 
 
 

 
 
 
 
 

 Called on the death of Henry Poley

Elections in the 1690s

Elections in the 1680s

 
 
 
 
 

 Caused by Peyton Ventris becoming a Justice of the Common Pleas

See also 
 List of parliamentary constituencies in Suffolk

Notes

References

Parliamentary constituencies in Suffolk
Constituencies of the Parliament of the United Kingdom established in 1295
Politics of Ipswich